USS Muscoota, was a 1370-ton Mohongo-class iron "double-ender" steam gunboat of the United States Navy during the American Civil War.

The ship was built at Greenpoint, New York, and commissioned in January 1865. She was at Norfolk, Virginia, in May 1865 when ordered to Key West as part of an effort to prevent Confederate President Jefferson Davis escaping abroad. Muscoota remained in the Gulf of Mexico area at least until August 1866, when she was sent north in response to a serious outbreak of yellow fever among her crew. George Westinghouse, future inventor and businessman, served aboard the warship as an engineer.

Sold in June 1869, she was extensively rebuilt for merchant employment and renamed Tennessee. The ship had only a short civilian career, as she was destroyed by fire near Little River, North Carolina, on 29 June 1870.

References
 Naval Historical Center Online Library of Selected Images: USS Muscoota
 Naval Historical Center Online Library of Selected Images: USS Tennessee
 Image here: https://www.ibiblio.org/hyperwar/OnlineLibrary/photos/images/h63000/h63884.jpg
 

Mohongo-class gunboats
1864 ships
Ships built in Brooklyn